The presidential car is the new vehicle which carries the head of state of Argentina, one of its supplements. This is Argentina's version of Cadillac One.

Juan Perón bought several Cadillacs, and a 1972 Ford Fairlane armored model, which years later made headlines for being abandoned on the street. In 1952, during the visit of President Dwight Eisenhower, General Motors Peron gave him a Cadillac convertible that would be used in all ceremonies of inauguration, to Néstor Kirchner. The vehicle is equipped with advanced equipment for its time, with up power windows, leather upholstery and telephone. Raúl Alfonsín, for his part, used a Renault 25. The car was spacious in the back and had a computer that interacts with the driver in a Spanish accent (a kind of GPS for the 1980s). It reported the amount of fuel in the tank and the opening of doors, among other data. Today, old cars gave way to a new breed of imported cars. Cristina Fernández de Kirchner used different models of the Volkswagen Group (Audi A6 (mostly), a Volkswagen Passat CC, and a Volkswagen Vento (Volkswagen Bora/Jetta IV)). All of them are armored and are matte black.

History 
During the presidency of Perón it was used a Cabriolet. A Falcon Cabriolet for the presidency of Arturo Illia, and a Rambler Ambassador to the chairs of Juan Carlos Onganía, Perón, and Isabel Perón. The vehicles had armor items were elongated 30 cm. Currently it is an Audi A8, this means of transport like the Tango 01 are a symbol of the presidency.

See also 

Official state car

References 

Argentina
Presidents of Argentina
Vehicles of Argentina